Stoke on Tern is a village located in Shropshire, England, on the River Tern. The civil parish is known as Stoke upon Tern.

Locality

The village straddles the River Tern, which flows through the south and west of the village. The parish includes the smaller settlements of Eaton upon Tern, Ollerton, Stoke Heath and Wistanswick. Its population of 1,740 in 440 households at the time of the 2001 census rose to 2,034 in 492 households at the 2011 Census. It was estimated to be 2,431 in 2019.

Amenities and transport

Stoke has a four-class primary school with a nursery attached. It continued to be graded "good" after a short Ofsted inspection in January 2018.

The nearest medical centre is at Hodnet (2.6 miles/4.2 km). The nearest shopping facilities and other amenities are at Market Drayton (6.5 miles/10.5 km).

Since 2020 there has been no bus service serving the village, although the 341 and 342 routes between Market Drayton and Telford via Childs Ercall were operated by Arriva Midlands until 2016. There have been petitions to reinstate the service. The village's nearest bus stop is now in Hodnet.

The edges of the parish are crossed by the main A53 and A41 roads.

Church
The Anglican Church of St Peter, Stoke on Tern, has a Sunday service every other week and a Wednesday prayer meeting four times a month. The church building (1874–1875) and some concurrent and earlier features to be found in and around it are Grade II listed. There is a war memorial listing the First World War victims of Stoke and Hodnet held in St Luke's Church, Hodnet.

Notable persons
Reginald Corbet (died 1566), a notable lawyer in the Tudor period, and his wife Alice Gratewood, inherited several Staffordshire and Shropshire manors, including Stoke, when her uncle, Rowland Hill, died in 1561.
Benjamin Whichcote (1609–1683), Puritan divine and 19th Provost of King's College, Cambridge, was born at Whichcote Hall, Stoke on Tern.

See also
Listed buildings in Stoke upon Tern

References

External links

Villages in Shropshire
Civil parishes in Shropshire